Sustain is a parameter of musical sound in time.

Sustain may also refer to:

 Sustain (album), a 2007 album by ska punk band Buck-O-Nine
 Sustain (composition) a 2018 orchestral composition by American composer Andrew Norman
 Sustained (law), a ruling to disallow the question, testimony, or evidence, issued by a judge in the law of the United States of America
 SUSTAIN (military), a concept in airborne warfare
 Sustainment (military), an aspect of logistics
 Sustainment (United States military)
 Principles of sustainment, US Army doctrine
 Sustainment Brigade, a type of US Army unit
 USS Sustain (AM-119), an Auk-class minesweeper

See also 
 
 
 Sustainability
 Sustainer (disambiguation)
 SustainUS, a non-profit youth advocacy group
 Sustenance